The Tetela languages are a clade of Bantu languages coded Zone C.70 in Guthrie's classification. According to Nurse & Philippson (2003), together with C.81 Dengese and C.89, the Shuwa "dialect" of Bushoong, the languages form a valid node. They are:
 Tetela–Hamba, Kusu, Nkutu, Yela, Ombo, (C80) Dengese, Shuwa (Pianga)

However, Yela is the same language as Kela, which is classified differently.

Maho (2009) adds Langa to C.70.

Footnotes

References